Cristina Garros Martínez was the first woman judge in the Court of Justice in Salta, Argentina, where she served from 2000 to 2012.  Graciela Kauffman de Martinelli replaced her when she retired serving till February  2018.

References

Living people
Year of birth missing (living people)
Place of birth missing (living people)
Argentine women judges
People from Salta
21st-century Argentine judges
20th-century Argentine lawyers
21st-century women judges